Spyair (stylized as SPYAIR) is a Japanese rock band from Nagoya, Japan, formed in 2005. The band currently consists of Yuji "UZ" Nakai (guitar, programming), Kenji "Momiken" Momiyama (bass guitar, leader) and Kenta Sasabe (drums). The band's name, SPYAIR, was determined in one shot by the members, which came from the word spyware, a type of computer virus.

History
The band was formed in 2005 and produced and released a number of materials themselves up until 2009 when they signed with the indie label U-Project. While with U-Project, they released the singles "Japanication" and "Kanjō Discord" before signing a major record deal with Sony Music in 2010. Their major debut single, "Liar," was released on August 11 and was used as the theme song for the drama Hammer Session!. Their second major single, "Last Moment," was released on December 1 and was used as the 25th ending song for the anime Bleach.

Spyair's indies debut single "Japanication" was re-released on March 16, 2011, followed by their fourth major single, "Samurai Heart (Some Like It Hot!!)," on June 8, which was used as the 17th ending song to the anime Gin Tama. In early 2012, the single "My World" was used as the second ending song for Mobile Suit Gundam AGE. The single "0 Game (Love Game)" was used as an official soundtrack for the 2012 film The Amazing Spider-Man in Japan. They also provided the theme song for the second Gin Tama movie, "Genjō Destruction". Their eighth major single "Naked" was released on September 5 and was followed by the announcement of the band's second album, Just Do It, which features 12 tracks including their last three singles.

In October, DJ ENZEL☆ announced that he would be leaving the band after their Nippon Budokan concert on December 18. The single "Wendy: It's You" was used as the theme song for the drama Koi Suru Hae Onna, which started airing in November. On December 18, the band successfully held their first live concert at the Nippon Budokan, performing a total of 21 songs including their latest singles. This concert was Enzel's last performance with the group. After the concert, they announced a new single, "Sakura Mitsutsuki," set for release on March 13, 2013. It was used as the 13th opening song for Gin Tama for the month of January.

Spyair's third studio album, Million, was released on August 7. On September 23, it was released by JPU Records in Europe, where the CD only version included three bonus tracks: "Last Moment," "Samurai Heart (Some Like It Hot!!)" and "My World." In October, the single "Just One Life" was used as the first opening song of the anime Samurai Flamenco. Their next single "Imagination" was released on April 30, 2014, and served as the first opening song of the anime Haikyū!!. The single "Firestarter," released on July 22, 2015, was used as the theme song for the drama The Last Cop. In October, Spyair contributed with the first opening song of the second season of Haikyū!!, "I'm a Believer", and a year later, their single "Rage of Dust" was used as the opening song of the second season of Mobile Suit Gundam: Iron-Blooded Orphans.

On March 31, 2022, it was announced that Ike would be leaving the band due to struggles with ulcerative colitis.

Musical style and influences 
The members of the band have cited their musical influences to be KORN, Linkin Park, and Michael Jackson. SPYAIR combines elements of rock, pop and electronic music.

Band members
  — guitar, programming 
  — bass guitar, leader 
  — drums 
Former member
  — DJ 
  — vocals

Timeline

Discography

Albums

Singles

Music videos

Awards and nominations
Billboard Japan Music Awards

|-
| 2012
| SPYAIR
| Animation Artist of the Year
| 
|-
| 2013
| SPYAIR
| Animation Artist of the Year
|
|}

JpopAsia Music Awards

|-
| rowspan="2"| 2013
| "Niji"
| Best Single
| 
|-
| Ike (SPYAIR)
| Best Use of Social Media
| 
|}

Neo Awards

|-
| 2016
| SPYAIR
| Best Musical Act
| 
|}

See also
 Japanese rock

References

External links
  
 
 
 Spyair discography on iTunes

Japanese alternative rock groups
Japanese pop rock music groups
Japanese hard rock musical groups
Musical groups established in 2005
Musical groups from Aichi Prefecture
Musical quartets
2005 establishments in Japan